The New England Summer Nationals was a popular, annual, four-day-long automotive festival in Worcester, Massachusetts. It usually occurred on the July 4th holiday weekend. The 2012 show was on July 5–8. In 1980, the first such festival attracted 2,000 visitors; since then, attendees have peaked at 200,000, drawn from both New England and the rest of the United States. According to the Central Massachusetts Convention and Visitors Bureau, it is the largest automotive event on the East Coast. Since 1991, it has generally drawn at least 75,000 visitors.

Events
The Summer Nationals has many events including drag racing, controlled burnouts, and stunt motorcycle riding.

References

External links
Official website

Auto shows in the United States
Motorcycling events
Motorcycle rallies in the United States
Recurring events established in 1980
Events in Massachusetts
Culture of Worcester, Massachusetts
1980 establishments in Massachusetts